The Karnataka Institute for DNA research (KIDNAR) is an autonomous medical institution at Karnatak University, Dharwad.

History
The department of Applied genetics of Karnatak University received a research grant of 4.10 crores from Department of Medical Education and Higher Education, Government of Karnataka to establish a Research Center for DNA Diagnostics. The Primary objective of the research Center was to undertake research in to the molecular diagnosis of genetic disorders prevalent in parts of Karnataka.

In 2013, the research center was renamed as Karnataka Institute for DNA research and was given the status of an autonomous institution by the state government. Approval to start DNA Fingerprinting service was given at KIDNAR which can reduce the dependency on Centre for DNA Fingerprinting and Diagnostics and Centre for Cellular and Molecular Biology for Karnataka Police.

Research
Presently, the KIDNAR is engaged in research into the molecular diagnosis of Hemophilia, Thalassemia, Breast Cancer, Parkinson’s disease, Hypercholesterolemia and different types of Leukemia. Additionally KIDNAR hosts Center of Excellence in Molecular Hemato-Oncology.

References

External links
Official website
Kannada interview of former director of KIDNAR, Pramod B.Gai

Medical research in India
Education in Hubli-Dharwad
Research institutes in Karnataka
Year of establishment missing